Tsiala Kasoshvili (born 1st september, 1963, Gori) is a Woman International chess Master (WIM) since 1988, her highest chess rating is 2265 (in Jan. 1989).

She is the National Georgian Woman Chess Champion in 1980 and 1981.

References

Chess Woman International Masters
People from Gori, Georgia
Living people
1963 births